"No Other Love" is a popular song.

The words were written by Bob Russell. The music is credited to Paul Weston but is actually derived from Frédéric Chopin's Étude No. 3 in E, Op. 10, and is practically identical to that of the song "Tristesse," a 1939 hit for French singer-actor Tino Rossi. It should not be confused with "No Other Love", written and composed by Broadway team Rodgers and Hammerstein.

A version recorded by Jo Stafford (Weston's wife) with Weston's orchestra backing her (released by Capitol Records as catalog number 1053), reached #8 on the Billboard chart in 1950. The piano artistry of George Greeley is also credited on the recording. This version of the song was featured in the trailers and final sound-track for Paul Thomas Anderson's 2012 film, The Master.

The French singer Serge Gainsbourg published the song "Lemon Incest," with his own lyrics but set to the same Chopin tune.  Sung as a duet with his daughter Charlotte Gainsbourg, it caused a scandal at the time.

The Ambassadors of Harmony men's barbershop chorus won the Barbershop Harmony Society 2012 Chorus Championship, singing an a cappella arrangement.

References

No Other Love
No Other Love
Jo Stafford songs
Songs written by Paul Weston
1950s ballads